During the closing ceremony of the 2022 Winter Olympics in Beijing, China the flag bearers of 91 National Olympic Committees (NOCs) arrived into Beijing National Stadium on February 20. The flag bearers from each participating country entered the stadium informally in single file, and behind them marched all the athletes. The flags of each country were not necessarily carried by the same flag bearer as in the opening ceremony.

Parade order
Athletes entered the stadium in an order dictated by the Olympic tradition. As the originator of the Olympics, the Greek flag bearer entered first.  The country that will host the next Winter Olympics, Italy, marched before the host nation China entered, instead of entering between New Zealand and Serbia, according to the Chinese collation order.

Countries marched in order of the Chinese language. The collation method used was based on the names as written in Simplified Chinese characters and is similar to that used in Chinese dictionaries. The names were sorted by the number of strokes in the first character of the name, then by the stroke order of the character (in the order 橫竖撇捺折, c.f. Wubi method), then the number of strokes and stroke order of the second character, then next character and so on.  For example, this placed San Marino in 28th position, just ahead of Kyrgyzstan because the initial character for "San Marino" is written in 5 strokes, while that for "Kyrgyzstan" is written in 6 strokes.

List
The following is a list of each country's flag bearer. The list is sorted by the sequence that each nation appeared in the Ceremony. The names are given in their official designations by the IOC, and the Chinese names follow their official designations by the Beijing Organizing Committee for the 2022 Olympic and Paralympic Winter Games.

Notes

References

closing ceremony flag bearers
Lists of Olympic flag bearers